The 1926 Tuskegee Golden Tigers football team was an American football team that represented Tuskegee University as a member of the Southern Intercollegiate Athletic Conference (SIAC) during the 1926 college football season. In their fourth season under head coach Cleveland Abbott, Tuskegee compiled a 10–0 record, won the SIAC championship, and outscored all opponents by a total of 288 to 84. The team was recognized as the black college national champion.

Schedule

References

Tuskegee
Tuskegee Golden Tigers football seasons
Black college football national champions
Tuskegee Golden Tigers football
College football undefeated seasons